Muller is a surname. Notable people with the surname include:

A–H
A. Charles Muller (born 1953), translator
Bauke Muller (born 1962), Dutch bridge player
Bennie Muller (born 1938), Dutch footballer 
Bill Muller (1965–2007), US journalist
Bobby Muller (born 1946), Vietnam veteran
Carl Muller (1935–2019), Sri Lankan Burgher writer, poet, and journalist
David E. Muller (1924–2008), American mathematician and computer scientist
Derek Muller (born 1982), science communicator
Dominique Muller (born 1949), French writer
Édouard Muller (painter) (1823–1876), Swiss-French painter
Édouard Muller (cyclist) (1919–1997), French road racing cyclist
Ellen Preis (Ellen Müller-Preis) (1912–2007), German-born Austrian fencer
Émile Muller (1915–1988), French politician
Filinto Muller (1900-1973), Brazilian politician
Franck Muller (born 1958), Swiss watchmaker
François Muller (1764–1808), French general of the French Revolutionary Wars
Frank Muller (1951–2008), Dutch audio book narrator and actor
Frans Muller (born 1960/61), Dutch businessman
Frederick Muller (1861–1946), American Medal of Honor recipient
Gary Muller (born 1964), South African tennis player
Germain Muller (1923–1994), French playwright, actor, poet, humourist, politician
Hendrik Pieter Nicolaas Muller (1859–1941), Dutch businessman, publicist, and diplomat
Henry J. Muller (1917-2022), American brigadier general
Henry J. Muller (CERDEC), American commanding general
Herbert J. Muller (1905–1980), American historian, academic, government official and author
Hermann Joseph Muller (1890–1967), US geneticist (Muller's ratchet) and educator
Muller (footballer, born 1986), Muller Santos da Silva, Brazilian football striker

J–Z
Jacques Muller (politician) (born 1954), French politician
Jacques Léonard Muller (1749–1824), French army commander of the French Revolutionary Wars
Jean M. Muller (1925–2005), French structural engineer
Jim Muller, co-founder of Voice of the Faithful
Judy Muller, American journalist
Kirk Muller (born 1966), Canadian hockey player
Kyle Muller (born 1997), American baseball player
Lucien Muller (born 1934), French footballer and manager
Luke Muller (born 1996), American sailor and Olympian 
Mae Muller (born 1997), English singer-songwriter
Mancow Muller (born 1966), American radio and television personality
Marcia Muller (born 1944), American mystery writer
Mary Ann Wilson Griffiths Müller (1819–1901) aka "Fémmina," New Zealand pamphleteer
Mervin E. Muller (1928–2018), American computer scientist
Peter Muller (Canadian football) (born 1951), Canadian football player
Peter Paul Muller (born 1965), Dutch actor
Pieter Muller (born 1969), South African rugby player
Richard A. Muller (born 1944), American physicist
Robert Muller (1923–2010), United Nations employee
Romeo Muller (1928–1992), American actor and writer
Scott Muller (canoeist) (born 1970), Panamanian canoer
Scott Muller (cricketer) (born 1971), Australian cricketer
Shulamith Muller (1922–1978). South African lawyer, communist, and anti-apartheid activist
Sophie Muller (born 1962), British music video director
Steven Muller (1927–2013), president of Johns Hopkins University
Victor Muller (born 1959), Dutch entrepreneur
Virginie Duby-Muller (born 1979), French politician
Yvan Muller (born 1969), French auto racing driver
Thomas Muller (born 1989), German football player for FC Bayern Munich

Fictional characters
Caroline "Cathy" Muller, fictional character created by Tom Clancy, wife of Jack Ryan
Rudolfine Muller, a character from Strike Witches
Jake Muller, Albert Wesker's illegitimate son and protagonist of the video game Resident Evil 6

See also

Muller, a tool used for grinding and mixing paint
Muller Martini, a manufacturer of printing equipment
Muller c-gate, an asynchronous logic component
Muller (restaurant), Michelin starred restaurant in Groningen, The Netherlands

German-language surnames
Dutch-language surnames